Staffordshire Moorlands is a constituency represented in the House of Commons of the UK Parliament since 2010 by Karen Bradley, a Conservative who served as Secretary of State for Culture, Media and Sport between 2016 and 2018, before she became Secretary of State for Northern Ireland from 2018 to 2019. As with all constituencies, the constituency elects one Member of Parliament (MP) by the first past the post system of election at least every five years. This seat has seen a swing to the Conservatives at the past four elections.

Karen Bradley was re-elected in the 2019 general election, with an increased majority of 16,428 votes.

Members of Parliament

Constituency profile
The constituency covers a substantial rural area of north-east Staffordshire, northeast of Stoke-on-Trent, and borders Derbyshire and Cheshire. The largest towns are Leek, with its cobbled square and a high street lined with independent boutiques, the Churnet valley and Biddulph, in which the famous Biddulph Grange Gardens is located. The area also includes the wooded, hillside village of Rudyard with its long man-made lake and miniature railway, and about 30% is in a sparsely populated part of the Peak District of small villages, including Wetton, site of Old Hannah's Cave. Other rural villages such as Longnor and Alton, home to the theme park Alton Towers make up the constituency. The southern part of Dove Dale on the border features rock climbing as well as Jacob's Ladder and Bertram's cave and well.

Workless claimants, registered jobseekers, were in November 2012 significantly lower than the national average of 3.8%, at 2.1% of the population based on a statistical compilation by The Guardian.

History
The forerunner seat, Leek, existed for nearly a century until 1983, and in its more recent history alternated between the Labour and Conservative parties three times after a Liberal had held the seat from 1910 until 1918. Despite this alternation, it was far from a bellwether (that is, a reflection of the national result), as Leek leaned more towards one party more than the other in two phases:

In the first, longer part of this period the seat was held mainly by William Bromfield (Lab), secretary of the Amalgamated Society of Textile Workers and Kindred Trades (ASTWKT), whose membership covered Staffordshire and South Cheshire, and then by the future Lord Davies of Leek, who as the main aide to the Prime Minister, was tasked with secret talks with Ho Chi Minh which failed due to a leak.

In the second part of this period David Knox (Con), a pro-European, toward the left of his party, and a supporter of Ted Heath when he faced Margaret Thatcher's leadership challenge, helped to establish the Tory Reform Group. During his long tenure as MP until 1997 he held the seat even during the Wilson-Callaghan government.

Since Charlotte Atkins' win in 1997 the seat has indeed been a bellwether for the national result.

There has been a swing to the Conservatives in the past four consecutive elections (2010, 2015 and 2017, 2019) and now the Conservatives have a majority of over 37% in this seat.

The current MP, Karen Bradley, served in the cabinet of both of Theresa May's governments, but returned to the backbenches after Boris Johnson became Prime Minister.

Boundaries

2010–present: The District of Staffordshire Moorlands wards of Alton, Bagnall and Stanley, Biddulph East, Biddulph Moor, Biddulph North, Biddulph South, Biddulph West, Brown Edge and Endon, Caverswall, Cellarhead, Cheddleton, Churnet, Dane, Hamps Valley, Horton, Ipstones, Leek East, Leek North, Leek South, Leek West, Manifold, and Werrington, and the Borough of Newcastle-under-Lyme ward of Newchapel.

1997–2010: The District of Staffordshire Moorlands wards of Alton, Biddulph East, Biddulph Moor, Biddulph North, Biddulph South, Biddulph West, Caverswall, Cheddleton, Horton, Ipstones, Leek North East, Leek North West, Leek South East, Leek South West, Leekfrith, Longnor, Warslow, Waterhouses, Werrington, and Wetley Rocks, and the Borough of Newcastle-under-Lyme wards of Butt Lane, Kidsgrove, Newchapel, and Talke.

1983–1997: The District of Staffordshire Moorlands.

History of boundaries
The constituency succeeded the former constituency of Leek at the 1983 general election. The boundary changes which took effect at the 1997 general election proved to be among the most controversial of all those proposed by the Boundary Commission. Initially only minor changes were to be made: two rural wards to transfer to Stone (newly created). However, in the same proposed boundary changes, the neighbouring community of Kidsgrove had been split between two constituencies, with two wards remaining in the constituency of Stoke-on-Trent North and two wards transferring to Newcastle-under-Lyme. At the local enquiry into the changes, it was argued that this division of Kidsgrove was unacceptable and the assistant commissioner consequently recommended that all four Kidsgrove wards be transferred instead to Staffordshire Moorlands. To make way for the 19,000 voters in Kidsgrove (to that date shown to be heavily Labour-supporting, two wards, Endon & Stanley and Brown Edge, were transferred to Stoke-on-Trent North, while two more rural wards were transferred to the Stone constituency. It was estimated that if the constituency had been fought on the pre-1997 Charlotte Atkins would have gained the seat by a majority of about 1,500 votes.

The boundary changes, which took effect at the 2010 general election, effectively reversed these changes: four of the five Kidsgrove wards transferred to Stoke-on-Trent North, with only one mainly rural ward, Newchapel, remaining in Staffordshire Moorlands. Brown Edge and Endon & Stanley returned to Staffordshire Moorlands. It was estimated that if the constituency had been fought at the 2005 election under the current boundaries, Labour would have lost the seat by 1,035 votes as opposed to the 2,438 votes that Charlotte Atkins won on that occasion.

Elections

Elections in the 2010s

The vote share change and hold status in 2010 comes from the notional, not actual, 2005 results because of boundary changes. Calculations of notional results (an estimate of how the seat would have voted in 2005 if it had existed then on the 2010 boundaries) suggested that the Conservatives would have won the seat, so the result in 2010 was classed as a Conservative "hold" by most sources.

Elections in the 2000s

Source:

Elections in the 1990s

Elections in the 1980s

See also
List of parliamentary constituencies in Staffordshire

Notes

References

Parliamentary constituencies in Staffordshire
Staffordshire Moorlands
Constituencies of the Parliament of the United Kingdom established in 1983
Politics of the Borough of Newcastle-under-Lyme